Khatiban may refer to:
 Khatiban, Shaft
 Khatiban, Sowme'eh Sara